KZSP 95.3 FM was a radio station licensed to South Padre Island, Texas and was last owned by MBM Texas Valley LLC.

MBM Texas Valley surrendered KZSP's license to the Federal Communications Commission on December 8, 2021, who cancelled it the same day.

KZSP last broadcast days were broadcast from transmitter at the MBM RESIDENCE South Padre Island

References

External links
KZSP's official website

ZSP
Radio stations established in 1989
Radio stations disestablished in 2021
1989 establishments in Texas
2021 disestablishments in Texas
Defunct radio stations in the United States
ZSP